Nick Doodeman (born 22 October 1996) is a Dutch professional footballer who plays as a winger for Willem II.

Club career
He made his Eerste Divisie debut for FC Volendam on 3 September 2017 in a game against SC Cambuur.

On 27 January 2021, it was announced that he will exchange FC Volendam for SC Cambuur for the next season. He has signed with SC Cambuur for two years.

Monday, 1 February 2021, it was announced that Nick will make the switch from FC Volendam to SC Cambuur immediately in the 2020-2021 season.

On 21 June 2022, Doodeman signed a three-year contract with Willem II who had recently been relegated from the Eredivisie.

Honours
Individual
Volendam Player of the Year: 2018–19

References

External links
 Career stats - Voetbal International
 
 

1996 births
People from Venhuizen
Living people
Association football forwards
Footballers from North Holland
Dutch footballers
Netherlands youth international footballers
FC Volendam players
SC Cambuur players
Willem II (football club) players
Eredivisie players
Eerste Divisie players
Derde Divisie players
VV De Zouaven players